Rade Hamović (13 February 1916 – 19 May 2009) was a Bosnian Serb general of the Yugoslav People's Army (JNA), who served as the Chief of the General Staff of the JNA from 16 June 1961 to 15 June 1967.

Previously, he held the rank of potporuchnik (junior officer) of the Royal Yugoslav Army, after graduating from the Military Academy in Belgrade in 1936, as one of the top 10 cadets in his class. During World War II in Yugoslavia, he was a member of the Supreme Headquarters of the Yugoslav Partisans.

References

Literature

1916 births
2009 deaths
People from Stolac
Serbs of Bosnia and Herzegovina
Chiefs of Staff of the Yugoslav People's Army
Royal Yugoslav Army personnel of World War II
Yugoslav Partisans members
Serbian generals
Generals of the Yugoslav People's Army
League of Communists of Yugoslavia politicians
Recipients of the Order of the People's Hero
Burials at Belgrade New Cemetery